In premixed turbulent combustion, Bray–Moss–Libby (BML) model is a closure model for a scalar field, built on the assumption that the reaction sheet is infinitely thin compared with the turbulent scales, so that the scalar can be found either at the state of burnt gas or unburnt gas. The model is named after Kenneth Bray, J. B. Moss and Paul A. Libby.

Mathematical description

The progress variable could be any scalar, i.e., we could have chosen the concentration of a reactant as a progress variable. The transition from zero to unity occurs instantaneously at the reaction sheet. Therefore, the probability density function for the progress variable is given by

By definition, the normalization condition leads to

It can be seen that the mean progress variable,

is nothing but the probability of finding burnt gas at location  and at the time . The density function is completely described by the mean progress variable, as we can write (supressing the variables )

Assuming constant pressure and constant molecular weight, ideal gas law can be shown to reduce to

where  is the heat release parameter. Using the above relation, the mean density can be calculated as follows

The Favre averaging of the progress variable is given by

Combining the two expressions, we find

and hence

The density average is

General density function

Nevertheless, the general form the density function can be written as

where  is the probability of finding the progress variable which is undergoing reaction (where transition from zero to unity is effected). Here, we have

where  is negligible in most regions.

References

Fluid dynamics
Combustion
Turbulence